The 2015 Penn State Nittany Lions football team represented Pennsylvania State University in the 2015 NCAA Division I FBS football season. The team was led by second year head-coach James Franklin and played its home games at Beaver Stadium in University Park, Pennsylvania. They were a member of the East Division of the Big Ten Conference. They finished the season 7–6, 4–4 in Big Ten play to finish in fourth place in the East Division. They were invited to the TaxSlayer Bowl where they lost to Georgia.

Schedule

Roster

Staff

Game summaries

Temple

This was Penn State's first loss to Temple since 1941.

Buffalo

Rutgers

San Diego State

Army

Indiana

Ohio State

Maryland

Illinois

Northwestern

Michigan

Michigan State

Georgia

References

Penn State
Penn State Nittany Lions football seasons
Penn State Nittany Lions football